The William R. Davie House, on Norman St. in Halifax, Halifax County, North Carolina, is a historic house with significance dating from 1783.   William R. Davie (1754–1820) was born in England.  He was a Founding Father of the United States and a patriot officer of mounted troops in the American Revolution who attended the Constitutional Convention from North Carolina, served as governor of North Carolina, served as a special ambassador to France during the XYZ Affair, and served in the North Carolina legislature. The house, also known as Loretta, was built on five acres that Davie bought in 1783.  It was built starting probably in about 1785.  It is a large two-story, frame side-hall plan house beneath a gable roof.  It has a two-story wing raised from an earlier one-story wing and a number of one-story rear additions.  The house is sheathed in weatherboard and rests on a brick foundation.

It was listed on the National Register of Historic Places in 1973.

References 

Houses on the National Register of Historic Places in North Carolina
Houses completed in 1785
Houses in Halifax County, North Carolina
National Register of Historic Places in Halifax County, North Carolina
Individually listed contributing properties to historic districts on the National Register in North Carolina
Buildings and structures in Halifax, North Carolina
Homes of United States Founding Fathers